Jan van der Horst may refer to:

Jan van der Horst (cyclist) (born 1942), Dutch cyclist
Jan van der Horst (rower) (born 1948), Dutch rower
Jan van der Horst (actor), Dutch actor in Gloria transita and Moutarde van Sonansee